2010–11 Syed Mushtaq Ali Trophy was the third edition of the Syed Mushtaq Ali Trophy competition, an Indian domestic team only Twenty20 cricket tournament in India. It was contested by 27 teams. Bengal emerged as winners of the tournament.
here

Group stage

East Zone

South Zone

North Zone

West Zone

Central Zone

Knockout stage

Final

References

External links
 Series home at ESPN Cricinfo
 Squads

Syed Mushtaq Ali Trophy
Syed Mushtaq Ali Trophy